María Vilas Vidal (born 31 May 1996) is a Spanish swimmer. She competed in the women's 800 metre freestyle event at the 2016 Summer Olympics.

Career
In the 2010 European Cup held in Catania, Italy, she won two gold medals in competitions 200m breaststroke and 400 m freestyle, a silver medal in the 200 m freestyle (22/02/91) and three bronze medals in the 100 m breaststroke and the 4 x 100 m freestyle relay and 4 x 200 M.

In 2016, Privamera Open Championship in Sabadell, Spain, she managed to qualify for the Olympics for the first time. In addition, he surpassed the Galician record 400 freestyle of Bea Gómez with a time of 6 4.38,81.

In the 2016 Summer Olympics, she participated in swimming events women's 800 meters freestyle and 400 medley women's singles.

References

External links
 

1996 births
Living people
Spanish female breaststroke swimmers
Spanish female freestyle swimmers
Spanish female medley swimmers
Olympic swimmers of Spain
Swimmers at the 2016 Summer Olympics
Place of birth missing (living people)
Mediterranean Games silver medalists for Spain
Mediterranean Games medalists in swimming
Swimmers at the 2013 Mediterranean Games
21st-century Spanish women